Coşkun Şahinkaya (born 1 January 1942), also known as Gabak Coşkun, is a Turkish former professional footballer. Şahinkaya was the second ever captain for Trabzonspor.

Personal life
Şahinkaya was one of 7 children, 6 sons and 1 daughter. His father İbrahim and eldest brother Yılmaz were amateur footballers in their youth. His brothers Güngör and Bülent were professional footballers who also played for Trabzonspor.

References

External links
Mackolik Profile

1942 births
Living people
Sportspeople from Trabzon
Turkish footballers
Association football midfielders
Süper Lig players
MKE Ankaragücü footballers
Trabzonspor footballers